Britannia was  launched at Plymouth in 1791. She first appeared in Lloyd's Register in 1792 with J.Bignal, master, Moore & co., owners, and trade London–Plymouth. A French privateer captured Britannia, Bignel, master, and burnt her in October 1793 as Britannia was sailing from London to Mogadore via Gibraltar.

Citations

1791 ships
Age of Sail merchant ships of England
Captured ships
Maritime incidents in 1793